The 2003 PBA season was the 29th season of the Philippine Basketball Association (PBA).

Board of governors

Executive committee
 Jose Emmanuel M. Eala (Commissioner) 
 Casiano Cabalan Jr. (Chairman, representing Barangay Ginebra Kings)
 Manuel M. Encarnado (Vice-Chairman, representing Sta. Lucia Realtors)
 Angelito Alvarez (Treasurer, representing FedEx Express)

Teams

Opening ceremonies
The muses for the participating teams are as follows:

Notable occurrences
The NBN/IBC consortium took over the league's TV coverage after winning the TV rights over the league's TV partner Viva Television in December 2002.
Noli Eala became the league's sixth commissioner after Jun Bernardino retired at the end of the 2002 season.
The league reintroduced the Invitational Championship and the Reinforced Conference.
The league reverted their rules of playing 12-minute quarters and the use of the 6.75 m (22.1 feet) three point line. The eight-second backcourt rule was retained. In 2002, the league adopted all of the FIBA basketball rules to prepare the players that will play for the Asian Games in Busan.
The Talk 'N Text Phone Pals filed a game protest on their match against the Barangay Ginebra Kings on March 21 and questioned the nullification of a possible game-winning shot of Asi Taulava with 0.2 seconds remaining in the first overtime. Barangay Ginebra eventually won the match, 122-117 in the second overtime. On March 26, PBA commissioner Noli Eala ordered to replay the game on April 22. All game statistics from the nullified game, including the 45-point, 18 rebound explosion of Eric Menk of Barangay Ginebra, and the 40-point, 14-assist output of Jimmy Alapag of Talk 'N Text will be removed from the PBA records. The replay was won by Talk 'N Text, 90-87. 
The league's greatest rivalry; the Crispa Redmanizers and Toyota Tamaraws clash in a reunion game coinciding the league's All-Star Weekend at the Araneta Coliseum.  The Toyota Tamaraws won, 65-61.
The NBN/IBC consortium and the PBA contested the placement of logos of Beam Toothpaste at the Araneta Coliseum's basketball flooring. The advertisement placements were done between the Araneta Coliseum and Nelson Macaraig's Jonels Promotion. A same agreement was done by Jonels Promotion for the PhilSports Arena weeks after. The league considered this as "backdoor advertising" as Macaraig did not enter an agreement with the PBA to put Beam's logos in the league's main playing venues and threatened the management of both venues that they will not hold their games at Araneta Coliseum and PhilSports Arena unless both will remove the Beam Toothpaste advertisements.
An estafa case was filed against Nelson Macaraig and Jonels Promotion after Macaraig issued a bounced check for P5 million for payment for the Beam Toothpaste advertisements at the Araneta Coliseum and PhilSports Arena.
Commissioner Noli Eala sanctioned the Talk 'N Text Phone Pals with a P250,000 fine, for shooting at their opponent's basket at the closing seconds of their match against Red Bull Barako on August 13, 2003. Talk 'N Text was leading with one point 88-87 and wanted to force the game to overtime since Talk 'N Text needed to win at least eight points to enter the playoffs. Talk 'N Text coach Ariel Vanguardia was separately fined with P50,000 and suspended for five games.
A random drug testing was initiated by the league and two players were suspended for testing positive in illegal substance: Alex Crisano of the Barangay Ginebra Kings and Jimwell Torion of Red Bull Barako.

2003 PBA All-Filipino Cup

Elimination round

Group A

Group B

Quarterfinal round

Group A

Group B

Playoffs

Finals 

|}

2003 PBA Invitational Championship

Qualification

PBA Philippine Cup 
Combined standings from the 2002 PBA All-Filipino Cup:

 Top 5 teams qualify outright
 Bottom 5 teams proceed to last-chance qualifying Mabuhay Cup

PBA-Samsung Mabuhay Cup

Elimination round

Group A

Group B

Playoffs

Finals 

|}

2003 PBA Reinforced Conference

Elimination round

Group A

Group B

Playoffs

Finals 

|}

Awards
 Most Valuable Player: Asi Taulava (Talk 'N Text) 
 Rookie of the Year:  Jimmy Alapag (Talk 'N Text)
 Sportsmanship Award: Patrick Fran
 Most Improved Player: Rafi Reavis (Coca-Cola)
 Defensive Player of the Year:  Rudy Hatfield (Coca-Cola)
 Mythical Five
Asi Taulava (Talk 'N Text)
Jimmy Alapag (Talk 'N Text)
Jeffrey Cariaso (Coca-Cola)
Rudy Hatfield (Coca-Cola)
Dennis Espino (Sta. Lucia)
 Mythical Second Team
Johnny Abarrientos (Coca-Cola)
Harvey Carey (Talk 'N Text)
Marlou Aquino (Sta. Lucia)
John Arigo (Alaska)
Don Allado (Alaska)
 All Defensive Team
Asi Taulava (Talk 'N Text)
Rudy Hatfield (Coca-Cola)
Marlou Aquino (Sta. Lucia)
Patrick Fran (Talk 'N Text)
Willie Miller (Red Bull)
 Gawad Emerson Coseteng Lifetime Achievement Award: Leo Prieto

Awards given by PBA Press Corps
 Coach of the Year: Chot Reyes (Coca-Cola)
 Mr. Quality Minutes: Renren Ritualo (Fedex)
 Referee of the Year: Ogie Bernarte
 Darling of the Media: Asi Taulava (Talk 'N Text)

Cumulative standings

Elimination round
The Mabuhay Cup records are treated as if they're elimination round games.

Playoffs

References

 
PBA